Rein Abbey was a Roman Catholic religious house for women located in Rissa on the Fosen peninsula to the northwest of Trondheim in Trøndelag, Norway.

History
Rein  Abbey was founded in or shortly after 1226. It was built on a prominent elevation in an otherwise flat landscape on the ancestral estate of Duke Skule Bårdsson, possibly in fulfilment of a vow after his recovery from an illness. It was dedicated to Saint Andrew. The first abbess was Duke Skule's half-sister, Sigrid Bårdsdatter. His daughter, Queen Margret of Norway, wife of King Håkon Håkonsson, spent her last years there. Many other women of the aristocracy also entered it.

In the trilogy  Kristin Lavransdatter written by Nobel laureate Sigrid Undset, the eponymous heroine spends her final years in Rein Abbey. There is no definite information on what order it belonged to, but it may well have followed the Rule of St. Augustine. It seems to have been a collegiate foundation, or community of secular canonesses, for noblewomen. The buildings were struck by lightning and burnt down in 1317, but quickly repaired.

During the Reformation, the abbey was dissolved and its assets taken over by the Crown. In 1531 the powerful and wealthy Ingerd Ottesdatter Rømer, otherwise Ingrid til Austrått, a leader of the Norwegian aristocracy, had herself elected administrator of the abbey. She was thus able to protect the remaining members of the community, as well as acquiring the abbey's estates, which continued in the possession of her descendants. Since 1704, the estate has been associated with the family of Trondheim merchant, Henrik Hornemann (1644-1716).

Abbey ruins
Some remains of the abbey structures are still to be seen among later buildings. The site has only once been investigated archaeologically, in 1861. The former abbey is protected by the Norwegian Directorate for Cultural Heritage (Riksantikvaren).

References

External links
 Norges klostre i middelalderen: Rein kloster 
Reinskloster website

16th-century disestablishments in Norway
Buildings and structures owned by the Society for the Preservation of Ancient Norwegian Monuments
Christian monasteries established in the 13th century
History of Trøndelag
Monasteries dissolved under the Norwegian Reformation
Nunneries in Norway
Religious organizations established in the 1220s
Ruins in Norway